Przemysław Truściński (born 15 December 1970 in Siedlce) Polish comics artist. He graduated Academy of Fine Arts In Łódź. He uses the Trust nickname.

Biography
He has worked as a comics artist for Gazeta Wyborcza, Playboy, Machina and Newsweek and as an advertisement artist in Pepsi and Nescafe. Awarded several prizes in International Festival of Comics and Games in Łódź. His short stories anthology Trust - historia choroby was published 2003, but numerous other short comics were published in various magazines and anthologies. His work on press comic was gathered in the Komiks W-wa compilation.

He is well known for his The Witcher game project.

Awards
 2013: Silver Cross of Merit

References

External links 
 

Polish comics artists
1970 births
Living people
People from Siedlce
Recipients of the Silver Cross of Merit (Poland)